No End in Sight: The Very Best of Foreigner is a greatest hits album that was released on July 15, 2008 by the rock band Foreigner. Aside from the classic hits, in their original versions, the album contains a brand new track, "Too Late", as well as live renditions of "Say You Will", "Starrider", and "Juke Box Hero/Whole Lotta Love" performed by the current line-up, featuring singer Kelly Hansen.

Track listing
All songs written by Mick Jones and Lou Gramm except where noted.

References 

2008 greatest hits albums
Foreigner (band) albums
Atlantic Records compilation albums
Rhino Records compilation albums